West Geauga High School is a public high school in Chester Township, Ohio.  It is the only high school in the West Geauga Local Schools district and serves Chester Township, Newbury Township, the Geauga portion of Hunting Valley, most of Russell Township, and a small part of Munson Township.

History
West Geauga School District formed in 1950 when Chester Township and Russell Township combined their township schools into one, becoming the first consolidated school district in Geauga County. In 2020, Newbury Township folded their school and through a territory transfer, became part of the district.

Awards and recognition
During the 2009-2010 school year, West Geauga High School was recognized with the Excellent with Distinction rating on the State Report Card from the Ohio Department of Education for the 10th consecutive year.

The West Geauga High School Salamander Education and Environmental Discovery Project received the 2010 Take Pride in America Outstanding Youth Volunteer Group national award.

The WGHS Science Department was recognized as an Intel School of Distinction 2010 Finalist. They were selected as one of three finalists out of over 600 applicants nationwide. This recognition is awarded for the school's achievement in science, innovative practices, enriched learning opportunities for students, use of technology, etc. They received a $5,000 award.

Clubs and activities
West Geauga's Latin Club functions as a local chapter of both the Ohio Junior Classical League (OJCL) and National Junior Classical League (NJCL).  The school also runs an Interact Club, KEY Club, Student Council, WESTG TV, Evirothon, Academic Challenge, Science Olympiad, National Honors Society, HUGS, Curio, Class Act, Whirlwind Newspaper, Yearbook, Ultimate Frisbee, Academic Decathlon, and Philosophy Club.

Alma mater
The Alma mater is played by the marching band before and after every home football game.  It is also sung by Class Act at the homecoming football game.  The Alma mater is sung to the tune of "The Maple Leaf Forever", a Canadian song written by Alexander Muir (1830–1906).

Athletics
The West Geauga Wolverines compete in the Chagrin Valley Conference. They play competitively in Division 2 though 4. The current sport offering is Cross Country, Track, Soccer, Tennis, Volleyball, Wrestling, Hockey, Gymnastics, Football, Basketball, Baseball, Softball, Lacrosse, Swimming and Diving, Golf, Fencing, and Marching Band. WGHS offers a policy of waiving gym class by participating in two complete seasons of any of the current sport offerings previously listed.

Ohio High School Athletic Association State Championships

 Softball - 1991, 1994, 1995
 Boys Basketball (Runner up) - 1988, 1989

Notes and references

High schools in Geauga County, Ohio
Public high schools in Ohio